Molo (Malkan) is a moribund Nilo-Saharan language spoken by a few of the Molo people of Sudan.

References

External links
 Molo basic lexicon at the Global Lexicostatistical Database

Critically endangered languages
Eastern Jebel languages
Languages of Sudan

mk:Акаски јазик